The 1956 Texas Longhorns football team represented the University of Texas at Austin during the 1956 NCAA University Division football season. In 1956, the Texas A&M Aggies were the first Aggie football team to beat the Texas Longhorns at Memorial Stadium. The win was Bear Bryant's only victory versus a University of Texas football team.

Schedule

References

Texas
Texas Longhorns football seasons
Texas Longhorns football